Madrasapattinam is a 2010 Indian Tamil-language historical romantic drama film written and directed by A. L. Vijay. The film stars Arya and Amy Jackson, in her feature film debut, while Nassar, Cochin Hanifa, Lisa Lazarus, and Alexx O'Nell play other prominent roles. The music was composed by G. V. Prakash Kumar with editing by Anthony and cinematography by Nirav Shah. The film was released on 9 July 2010 and became a box office success.

Plot
An elderly English woman named Amy Wilkinson, almost at her deathbed in London due to a blood clot caused by a past head injury, wants to come down to Madras in search of a man named Ilam Parithi, whom she last saw on 15 August 1947. She wishes to return a thali (traditional wedding threads) belonging to his mother, which he gave her as a sign that she belongs to India and nobody can separate them. However, after a turn of events, she had married another man from her hometown and thus felt that the thali was no longer her property.

Amy arrives in Madras with her granddaughter Catherine, equipped only with a picture of Parithi that was taken 60 years ago. Amy interrogates various people about Parithi's whereabouts. In the process, she recalls the events when she had first visited Chennai, and the chain of events that took place.

A young Amy, the daughter of the Madras Presidency Governor, George Wilkinson, visits Chennai (then called Madras, with the Chennai District being called Madrasapattinam) along with her translator Nambi and encounters Parithi, whom she calls a "brave man". Parithi, a member of the dhobi (washermen) clan, is also an experienced wrestler who trains under Ayyakanu. He openly opposes the British officials who attempt to build a golf course in the dhobi clan's dwelling place. He challenges a cruel racist officer named Robert Ellis, who is also Amy's suitor, to a wrestling match to decide the fate of his clan's home. Parithi is successful, and Ellis vows revenge.

In between this, the scene shifts to the present day where the aged Amy, who is going around Chennai looking for Parithi, starts remembering the olden days. She and Catherine go in a taxi driven by Veerasekhara Murali and his assistant. They track down an old woman named Selvi (as Parithi's sister's name was Selvi) in hopes that she is Parithi's sister. It turns out that she is not the person whom they were looking for. Catherine suggests that they go to the Census Office to identify Parithi. Murali then gives an idea of painting Parithi as he would look now. They go meet a painter who gets drunk with the money they gave. When his wife sees his drunken stupor, she furiously throws old frames, and Amy identifies one of them to be a photo taken by her. They track down the owner of the image (ChennaiImages.com), which is actually a shooting spot for dramas. They meet the manager, and he says that the pictures were bought in an auction years ago. After they leave, his wife asks him why he lied about the images that his grandfather had saved. Later, it is shown that the man is Nambi's grandson.

Later, Amy falls ill while at her room and is rushed to the hospital. There she meets Parithi's friend, Kabir, in his deathbed. When she inquires about Parithi's whereabouts to Kabir in Tamil, Murali and his assistant get shocked. Kabir breathes his last, saying only the words "Durai Amma", following which he dies soon after.  When Murali asks Amy about her knowledge in Tamil and why she did not speak it before, Amy blankly stares at the Cooum River. She narrates her younger days to the three of them.

Following a series of secret meetings between Parithi and Amy, love blossoms between them, and Parithi affectionately calls her "Durai Amma" (lady/female lord), a polite term of addressing British women. However, a major threat comes in the form of independence for India on 15 August 1947, which means that all British white officials and their families, including Amy, would have to leave India. On the eve of independence, all of India is celebrating. However, Amy and Parithi, determined to be together, run away and are hunted by an angry Ellis and his men. An Indian policeman helps the two of them by hiding them in a clock tower on top of the Madras Central Railway Station, but they are discovered by Ellis. After a fierce fight, Ellis is killed, Amy is injured in her head, and Parithi is badly wounded. Amy helps Parithi escape by casting him with a life-raft into the Cooum River, before she is captured and taken back to London. She had never known if Parithi survived or what his fate was.

Back in the present day, Amy is urgently called back to London to have a life-saving operation. However, she is determined to find Parithi and by chance encounters a taxi driver who assumes that she would want to visit a charitable trust named Durai Ammal Foundation. The driver shows her around the foundation, which has organizations providing free housing for orphans and the elderly, medical care, and affordable education (all of which were promised to the dhobi children by the young Amy several years ago). She realizes that the Durai Ammal Foundation was established by Parithi and named after her.

Then, when Amy asks the driver what happened to Parithi, he leads her to his tomb and reveals that he died 12 years ago. She kneels before the tomb and claims the thali as her own. She declares "It's mine!" before quietly passing away on Parithi's tomb. Catherine mourns for her, and the taxi driver is dumbfounded to learn that the old woman was "Durai Amma" herself.

The epilogue shows Parithi and Amy (as they were in their younger days) in the afterlife, depicted as a 1940s-style Madrasapattinam. As the credits roll, a series of montage images are shown, illustrating the transformation of the early 20th century Madras into modern-day Chennai.

Cast

 Arya as Ilamparithi aka Parithi
 Amy Jackson as Amy Wilkinson / Duraiammal
 Carole Trangmar-Palmer as Older Amy Wilkinson / Duraiammal
 (Voiceover by Andrea Jeremiah)
 Nassar as Ayyakanu
 Cochin Haneefa as Nambi
 Alexx O'Nell as Robert Ellis* Lisa Lazarus as Catherine
 M. S. Bhaskar as Vengappan
 Bala Singh as Duraisamy
 Omar Lateef as Kabir
 N. L. Srinivasan as Karna
 Sathish as Pacha
 M. R. Kishore Kumar as Rengan
 Elango Kumaravel as Taxi Driver
 Balaji Venugopal as Veerasekhara Murali
 Lollu Sabha Jeeva as Murali's assistant
 Jack James as Governor George Wilkinson
 George Maryan as English Teacher
 Appukutty as Kaali
 Sampath Ram as Anbazhagan
 Leema Babu as Selvi
 Loveday Smith as George's wife
 Jayakumar as Nambi's grandson
 Ajayan Bala as Chennai Central Station Master
 Nicholas as DSP
 Gary Tantony as Golf Grounds Engineer
 Mike Parish as The Reverend M. Smith
 Matthieu Bellon as British Officer
 Neelu Nasreen
 T. M. Karthik as Painter (uncredited)

Production
Director A. L. Vijay revealed that Madrasapattinam was supposed to happen later in his career, but the intervention of producer Kalpathi S. Aghoram helped realize the viability of the film earlier.  Vijay had first explored the script in his college days and drew inspiration from an English professor who "used to talk to us about the freedom movement a lot," furthering Vijay's interest in history. He visualized the people who lived in the pre-independence period of India and explored the concept of how it would have been if an English girl fell in love with an Indian boy, laying the foundations for the script. The script took six months to write, with leading Tamil writer Prapanchan and visits to see independence veterans being helpful in understanding the history of the city of Madras between 1945 and 1947.

Mahesh Babu was asked to play the lead role but could not accept it,
so Arya was finalized to play the lead role, and English Miss Teen World winner Amy Jackson was selected after Vijay found a picture of her on the Internet and tracked her down. Vijay approached Harris Jayaraj as music composer first, but out of his call sheets, Vijay chose G. V. Prakash Kumar as music composer of the movie. Both Vijay and Prakash had earlier worked together in Kireedam.

The film was finished in eight months and released on 9 July 2010.

Soundtrack

The soundtrack of Madrasapattinam was composed by G. V. Prakash Kumar and was released on 4 April 2010 by Kamal Haasan and Telugu actor Allu Arjun. Lyrics were written by Na. Muthukumar. The track "Pookal Pookum" is based on Darbari Kanada raga.

Tamil track list

Telugu tracklist

Release
The satellite rights of the film were sold to Kalaignar TV.

Reception

Critical response
Indiaglitz wrote: "Away from the madding crowd of commercial clichés, Madharasapattinam is a film that would send positive vibes among those who love meaningful films." Sify stated that the film was a "brave attempt on the part of its makers".

The film's Telugu dubbed version 1947: A Love Story has also received positive reviews from critics, who have added that it might not do well at the box office. Fullhyd.com rated it 5.5 out of 10, calling it "a film that looks as beautiful as the erstwhile Madras town in which it is set", but also said that "despite being a near-perfect concoction of romance, action, drama and comedy, it is a little too slow and sober for the festive season (during which it was released)". 123telugu.com rated the movie 3 out of 5, appreciating its art direction, but saying that it does not aim too high in terms of its content. Haricharan Pudipeddi of nowrunning.com gave it 3 stars out of 5, and said that the film succeeds in painting one of the cutest love stories of the recent past.

Box office
The film opened and stayed at No. 1 in Chennai box office charts for 15 weeks.

Awards
Filmfare Awards South
The film received 7 nominations at the Filmfare Awards South. 
 Nominated: Best Film – Tamil
 Nominated: Best Director – Tamil – A. L. Vijay
 Nominated: Best Actor – Tamil – Arya
 Nominated: Best Supporting Actress – Tamil – Carole Palmer
 Nominated: Best Music Director – Tamil – G. V. Prakash Kumar
 Nominated: Best Male Playback Singer – Tamil – Udit Narayan for "Vaama Duraiyamma"
 Nominated: Best Lyricist – Tamil – Na. Muthukumar for "Vaama Duraiyamma"

Vijay Awards
 Best Costume Designer – Deepali Noor
 Best Art Director – Selva Kumar
 Nominated: Best Film
 Nominated: Best Director – A. L. Vijay
 Nominated: Best Actor – Arya
 Nominated: Best Cinematographer – Nirav Shah
 Nominated: Best Music Director – G. V. Prakash Kumar
 Nominated: Best Debut Actor Female – Amy Jackson
 Nominated: Best Male Singer – Roop Kumar Rathod for "Pookal Pookum"
 Nominated: Best Female Singer – Harini for "Pookal Pookum"
 Nominated: Best Visual effects – Karthik Kotamraju (EFX)
Edison Awards
 Best Patriotic Movie – A. L. Vijay
 Best Music Director – G. V. Prakash Kumar

Mirchi Music Awards
 Nominated: Best Music Director – G. V. Prakash Kumar for "Pookal Pookum"
 Won: Best Song of the Year for "Pookal Pookum"

See also
 List of historical films set in Asia

References

External links 
 

2010 films
2010 romantic drama films
2010s historical romance films
2010s Tamil-language films
Films about interracial romance
Films directed by A. L. Vijay
Films scored by G. V. Prakash Kumar
Films set in 1947
Films set in Chennai
Films set in London
Films set in the British Raj
Films shot in Chennai
Films shot in London
Indian historical romance films
Indian nonlinear narrative films
Indian romantic drama films